Jean-Baptiste Lamy (October 11, 1814 – February 13, 1888), was a French-American Roman Catholic prelate who served as the first Archbishop of Santa Fe, New Mexico. Willa Cather's novel Death Comes for the Archbishop is based on his life and career.

Early life
Lamy was born in Lempdes, Puy-de-Dôme, in the Auvergne region of France, 10 km east of the main regional city of Clermont-Ferrand. He completed his classical studies in the minor seminary at Clermont and theological coursework in the Major seminary at Montferrand, where he was trained by the Sulpician Fathers (Society of Saint-Sulpice).

Career
He was ordained a priest on December 22, 1838.  After a few months as an assistant priest in his native diocese, in 1839 Lamy asked for and obtained permission to answer the call for missionaries of Bishop John Baptist Purcell, of Cincinnati, Ohio.

Episcopacy

As a missionary in North America, Lamy served at several missions in Ohio and Kentucky when, to his surprise, he was notified that Pope Pius IX was appointing him as bishop of the recently created Apostolic Vicariate of New Mexico on July 23, 1850.  At the same time, he was appointed Titular Bishop of Agathonice.  He was consecrated a bishop on November 24, 1850 by Archbishop Martin Spalding of Louisville; Bishops Jacques-Maurice De Saint Palais of Vincennes and Louis Amadeus Rappe of Cleveland served as co-consecrators.

After an arduous journey on primitive transportation, Lamy reached Santa Fe in the summer of 1851. As such, Lamy was joining a long list of French people who explored, traded and settled in New Mexico since the 16th century; specifically, French priests dominated New Mexico’s Catholic Church from 1841 to 1914.

Lamy entered Santa Fe on 9 August 1851, and was welcomed by the Governor of the territory, James S. Calhoun, and many other citizens. However, Juan Felipe Ortiz, a Spanish priest who was responsible for administration of the Catholic Church in New Mexico, told Lamy that he and the local clergy did not recognize his authority and would remain loyal to Bishop José Antonio Laureano de Zubiría of the Diocese of Durango, Mexico, who had visited Santa Fe just a few months before.  Lamy wrote to Zubiría asking him to explain the change of responsibility to the New Mexico priests. When his request was unanswered, he went in person to Durango to meet with Zubiría, showing him the papal document that appointed Lamy. In light of this, Zubiría had to agree to inform the priests of the change.

On July 23, 1853, the Vicariate of New Mexico was raised to the Diocese of Santa Fe, and Lamy was appointed its first bishop.  His early efforts as bishop were directed to reforming the New Mexico church, the building of more churches in the territory, the creation of new parishes, and the establishment of schools. He ended the practice of concubinage widely practiced by the local priests and he suppressed religious brotherhood societies within individual communities. He participated in the First Vatican Council from 1869-1870.

Lamy was responsible for the construction of the Cathedral Basilica of Saint Francis of Assisi (commonly known as St. Francis Cathedral) and Loretto Chapel.  Both churches were built in French styles familiar to Lamy — the Cathedral is Romanesque Revival, while the Chapel is Neo-Gothic.  On February 12, 1875, the Diocese of Santa Fe was elevated to an archdiocese with Lamy as its first archbishop.  On May 1, 1885, Lamy consecrated Peter Bourgade as bishop; Bourgade would later become the fourth Archbishop of Santa Fe.

Lamy ended his tenure as bishop when he resigned in 1885. He was appointed Titular Archbishop of Cyzicus later that year.

Death and legacies
He died of pneumonia in 1888 and is buried under the sanctuary floor of the basilica. A bronze statue, dedicated in 1915, stands in his memory outside the front entrance of the Basilica, and the village of Lamy, New Mexico, was named after him near the source of the sandstone for the Cathedral.

Lamy was succeeded as Archbishop of Santa Fe by Jean-Baptiste Salpointe, also from Puy-de-Dôme, France.

The Archbishop Lamy's Chapel in Santa Fe, built in 1874, survives and is listed on the U.S. National Register of Historic Places.

Willa Cather's novel Death Comes for the Archbishop fictionalizes his life, missionary journeys, and erection of the Santa Fe cathedral.

See also
 Roman Catholic Archdiocese of Santa Fe
 Roman Catholic Church
 Cathedral Basilica of St. Francis of Assisi
 Loretto Chapel

References
Citations

Sources

External links
 Archdiocese of Santa Fe home page
 New Mexico Office of the State Historian: Lamy, Jean-Baptiste

1814 births
1888 deaths
People from Puy-de-Dôme
French emigrants to the United States
French Roman Catholic missionaries
Roman Catholic Archdiocese of Cincinnati
People of the New Mexico Territory
French Roman Catholic bishops in North America
19th-century Roman Catholic archbishops in Mexico
Participants in the First Vatican Council
Roman Catholic archbishops of Santa Fe
Roman Catholic titular archbishops
Deaths from pneumonia in New Mexico
Roman Catholic missionaries in the United States